Gustavo Rubén Lorenzetti Espinosa (born May 10, 1985, in Rosario, Santa Fe Province, Argentina) is an Argentine-Chilean professional footballer, who plays as an attacking midfielder for Chilean Primera División club Deportes Iquique.

Career
Lorenzetti joined Rosario Central youth squad in 1994. He made his professional debut for Rosario Central of the Primera Division Argentina on September 28, 2003.  The coach at the time was Miguel Russo.  Lorenzetti made his first start on February 22, 2004, against Boca Juniors.  He also participated in Copa Libertadores 2004.

In 2006, he was loaned to Chilean club Coquimbo Unido.  The team made it to the playoffs and Lorenzetti scored 4 goals and made twelve assists that season.

Universidad de Concepción
In 2007, Lorenzetti was loaned again to a Chilean club this time Universidad de Concepción with an option to buy the player at the end of the year.  He again made the Chilean playoffs.  In the first round of the playoffs, Universidad de Concepción upset Universidad Católica.  In the second leg of the semifinal against Audax Italiano, the number one seed,  Universidad de Concepción was on the verge of elimination when Lorenzetti scored an amazing goal to qualify Universidad de Concepción to the final against Colo-Colo.

In 2008, Universidad de Concepción picked up the option on Lorenzetti and bought the rights to the player. That year he won the 2008 Copa Chile tournament, defeating Deportes Ovalle in the final by 2–1.

Universidad de Chile

On 9 June 2011, Universidad de Chile signed Lorenzetti from Universidad de Concepción for a fee of US$600,000 on a three-year contract. He scored a goal in his official debut in a 3–0 home win over La Serena on 30 July, for the first week of the Clausura Tournament. In his second official game, against Cobreloa, Lorenzetti scored two goals in the club's 3–1 victory and was named the man of the match. Some weeks later, he scored a brace in a 4–1 victory to Ñublense and in the following week scored again,  in a 3–0 win over Unión San Felipe.

His good moment was thanks to the great season of the club in the national tournament and in the Copa Sudamericana that the club won after winning the finals versus LDU Quito on an aggregate result of 4–0 in favor of Lorenzetti's club. He scored a goal in the second final that the club won 3–0.

Personal life
Lorenzetti holds dual Argentine-Chilean nationality since he naturalized Chilean by residence in January 2017.

Honours

Club
Universidad de Concepción
Copa Chile (1): 2008–09

Universidad de Chile
Primera División de Chile (4): 2011 Clausura, 2012 Apertura, 2014 Apertura, 2017 Clausura
Copa Sudamericana (1): 2011
Copa Chile (1): 2012–13, 2015
Supercopa de Chile (1): 2015

References

External links

 Argentine Primera statistics  
 Profile at Universidad de Chile website 
 

1985 births
Living people
Footballers from Rosario, Santa Fe
Argentine footballers
Association football midfielders
Naturalized citizens of Chile
Chilean footballers
Rosario Central footballers
Coquimbo Unido footballers
Universidad de Concepción footballers
Universidad de Chile footballers
Club Nacional de Football players
Deportes Iquique footballers
Argentine Primera División players
Chilean Primera División players
Uruguayan Primera División players
Primera B de Chile players
Argentine expatriate footballers
Argentine expatriate sportspeople in Chile
Argentine expatriate sportspeople in Uruguay
Chilean expatriate footballers
Chilean expatriate sportspeople in Uruguay
Expatriate footballers in Chile
Expatriate footballers in Uruguay